Keven Alexander McKenna ( 1944 – March 4, 2022) was an American lawyer and politician.

McKenna was born in Westerly, Rhode Island and graduated from Westerly High School. He went to Georgetown University, Georgetown University Law Center, and Syracuse University. He served as a Rhode Island Assistant Attorney General. McKenna served in the Rhode Island House of Representatives from 1979 to 1985 and was a Democrat. He died on March 4, 2022, at the age of 77.

References

Year of birth unknown
1940s births
2022 deaths
People from Westerly, Rhode Island
Georgetown University alumni
Georgetown University Law Center alumni
Syracuse University alumni
Rhode Island lawyers
Democratic Party members of the Rhode Island House of Representatives